Fraus orientalis is a moth of the family Hepialidae. It is endemic to New South Wales.

References

Moths described in 1989
Hepialidae